Mojarra is a family, Gerreidae, of fish in the order Perciformes.

Mojarra may refer to:

 Mojarra, the reference implementation of Jakarta Server Faces (JSF; formerly JavaServer Faces)
 La Mojarra, a place in Mexico
 Las Mojarras, a place in Argentina
 Los Mojarras, a Peruvian band